Bishop Heber High School is a comprehensive secondary school in Malpas, Cheshire, England. The school is named after bishop Reginald Heber (1783–1826), who was born in Malpas and is remembered chiefly as a hymn-writer.  In 2011, the school was rated outstanding in that year's Ofsted inspection.

In January 2022, the school criticised for allowing only school-branded coats to be worn on site. Parents claimed that children were in jumpers and 'freezing' while staff were in warm coats.

Notable former pupils

Ben Curry, rugby union footballer for Sale Sharks
Tom Curry, rugby union footballer for Sale Sharks
Jo Fletcher, footballer for Everton ladies and England ladies
Ben Foden, rugby union footballer for Northampton Saints and England
Chloe Hewitt, dancer
Mark Hopley, rugby union footballer and coach for Northampton Saints
Vicky Thornley, Olympic rower
Christina Trevanion, professional antiques dealer and television personality
Ben Woodburn, footballer for Liverpool and Wales

References

Secondary schools in Cheshire West and Chester
Foundation schools in Cheshire West and Chester
1960 establishments in England
Educational institutions established in 1960
Malpas, Cheshire